Masalia is a village in the Masalia, Dumka CD block in the Dumka Sadar subdivision of the Dumka district in the Indian state of Jharkhand.

Geography

Location

Overview
The map shows a large area, which is a plateau with low hills, except in the eastern portion where the Rajmahal hills intrude into this area and the Ramgarh hills are there. The south-western portion is just a rolling upland. The entire area is overwhelmingly rural with only small pockets of urbanisation.

Note: The full screen map is interesting. All places marked on the map are linked in the full screen map and one can easily move on to another page of his/her choice. Enlarge the full screen map to see what else is there – one gets railway connections, many more road connections and so on.

Area

Demographics
According to the 2011 Census of India, Masalia had a total population of 399, of which 199 (50%) were males and 200 (50%) were females. Population in the age range 0–6 years was 62. The total number of literate persons in Masalia was 337 (59.35% of the population over 6 years).

Civic administration

Police station
There is a police station at Masalia.

CD block HQ
Headquarters of Masalia, Dumka CD block is at Masalia village.

Education
Kasturba Gandhi Balika Vidyalaya, Masalia, is a Hindi-medium girls only institution established in 2005. It has facilities for teaching from class VI to class XII.

Government High School Masalia is a Hindi-medium coeducational institution established in 1956. It has facilities for teaching from class IX to class XII.

Model School Masalia is a Hindi-medium coeducational institution established in 2011. It has facilities for teaching from class VI to class XII.

Project Girls High School Masalia is a Hindi medium girls only institution established in 1985. It has facilities for teaching in classes IX and X.

References

Villages in Dumka district